Eubela distincta is a species of sea snail, a marine gastropod mollusk in the family Raphitomidae.

Description

Distribution

References

External links
 Biolib.cz: original image

Raphitomidae
Gastropods described in 1925